Quantilly is a commune in the Cher department in the Centre-Val de Loire region of France.

Geography
The grapes for Menetou-Salon wine are grown here.

Population

Sights
 The church of St Genou, dating from the eighteenth century.
 The nineteenth-century chateau of Champgrand.
 The eighteenth-century chateau of Quantilly.

See also
Communes of the Cher department

References

Communes of Cher (department)